Thursday is an American post-hardcore band, formed in New Brunswick, New Jersey, in 1997. The band currently consists of Geoff Rickly (lead vocals), Tom Keeley (lead guitar, backing vocals), Steve Pedulla (rhythm guitar, backing vocals), Tim Payne (bass), and Tucker Rule (drums).

Thursday released their debut album, Waiting, in late 1999 with original guitarist Bill Henderson, who left the band in 2000 and was replaced by Steve Pedulla. The band gained popularity with the release of their second album, Full Collapse, in 2001, and released their third album and major label debut, War All the Time, in 2003, which reached number seven on the US Billboard Top 200 Albums chart. Thursday released their fourth album, A City by the Light Divided, in 2006, and two further albums, Common Existence (2009) and No Devolución (2011), before announcing an indefinite hiatus in 2011. In a January 2013 interview, Geoff Rickly confirmed that the band had officially disbanded. However, the band announced a reunion in 2016 and performed a series of shows within the next few years. In October 2018, the band announced their reunion would conclude with a performance at Saint Vitus in Brooklyn, New York on March 17, 2019; despite this, Thursday had played more shows by the end of 2019, and resumed activity as a band in the fall of 2021 with a series of live dates, including an appearance at Riot Fest in Chicago.

The band has been considered an influential band of the post-hardcore music scene in the 2000s, and is credited as one of the key bands to popularize the darker emo sound and screaming vocals which came to prominence at the time.

History

Formation and Waiting (1997–2000)

Thursday was formed in 1997 by vocalist Geoff Rickly, guitarist Tom Keeley, guitarist Bill Henderson, bassist Tim Payne, and drummer Tucker Rule. The band began playing basement shows in New Brunswick and the surrounding New Jersey and New York areas, playing their first official show on December 31, 1998 in Rickly's basement alongside Midtown, Saves the Day and Poison the Well.

The band recorded demos to hand out at shows, and in the summer of 1999, teamed up with MP3.com for their first official release, the 1999 Summer Tour EP, which featured demos of songs that would soon be found on their debut album, Waiting. The album was released on December 6, 1999 on northern New Jersey-based Eyeball Records without any singles or support from television or radio.

Full Collapse (2001–2002)
In 2001, Thursday signed to independent label Victory Records. After signing, they were warned by their friends that they "gotten ourselves into a situation that we would regret". The group were unsure what they meant, but thought things would turn out fine due to their contract with the label. They initially thought that part of the contract meant they could sign with a different label would they want to. However, they realized the deal had in fact stated they could only leave Victory if it was to join a major label, which they thought was "a far-fetched idea to say the least." Later in the year, they released their second album Full Collapse through the label, eventually reaching number 178 on the Billboard 200. Before appearing on Warped Tour, the group visited Victory's offices and learned about Thursday-branded whoopee cushions that the label was planning to sell at the tour. Vocalist Geoff Rickly discussed this matter with Victory founder Tony Brummel, and according to the band, responded that Victory "was a big company and that they didn't have time to run everything by the band."

On a number of occasions, the group attempted to have better communication with the label in regards to promotion. On one occasion, Brummel informed them they were not living up to his expectations. Sometime afterwards, the group were touring with Saves the Day. Brummel became more positive in his interactions, frequently calling the band "just to say hello, or to ask how record sales at shows were going." The group were disappointed that his positivity "wasn't there from the beginning. ... Instead of Tony's relationship with us being based on a love for music, it was based entirely on numbers." The band's new-found popularity and disgust with the label led to internal problems, which almost led the band to disband. The situation caused the creation of the Five Stories Falling EP, a release the band used to fulfill contractual obligations with Victory Records. At live shows, the band routinely told fans not to purchase the EP, but instead to download "Jet Black New Year", the only new studio recording found on the EP, with the rest consisting of live performances of four Full Collapse songs. While all the interactions with the label were occurring, the group were being contacted by major labels. The group, who "didn't understand [anything] about major labels", pondered about other independent labels they would join. However, due to their contract they wouldn't be allowed to move to another independent label. Throughout 2001, people from major label Island Records had been to the band's shows since they became a full-time touring act. Soon after, the label expressed interest in signing the band.

War All the Time (2003–2005)
In late May 2002, the group announced they had signed to Island Records, following a bidding war between other major labels. Up to this point, Full Collapse had sold 111,000 copies. On September 9, the group's signing to Island Records was made official following negotiations of an exit agreement with Victory Records. The agreement required parent company Island/Def Jam to buy out Victory's contract claim for the group's next two albums. Rickly said as a result of the deal, Victory Records received $1,200,000, which meant the band would be "[paying off] that bill for as long as we were on the new label." In addition, their next two albums were required to feature the Victory logo.

With expectation building for their follow-up album, Rickly wanted their next album to be "really aggressive and progressive ... and have all these boundary pushing ideas". In September and October, the group went on the Plea for Peace Tour, and were planning to work on their next album following its conclusion. They said they had accumulated a lot of ideas but were unable to work on them due to touring. In mid-November, the group began writing new material.

After an entire writing and recording process that took only six months, the band issued their third album and major label debut, War All the Time, on September 16, 2003 to critical acclaim and strong commercial performance. War All the Time was the first release to feature Andrew Everding on keyboards, though he would not become an official member of the band until December 2004, when he was officially welcomed into the band at a Christmas holiday show held at the Starland Ballroom in Sayreville, New Jersey. The album's title, coupled with it being released approximately two years after the terrorist attacks of September 11, 2001, led many critics to believe it was a political album; however, Rickly has denied this on many accounts, instead claiming that he is speaking about love being a war. The album spawned two singles: "Signals Over the Air" and "War All the Time", though the latter received considerably less attention due to MTV banning the video for controversial material involving a fake news feed that appeared to be real and teenagers being weapon targets.

Thursday toured extensively to support War All the Time, featuring dates with acts such as AFI, Thrice, and Coheed and Cambria. On these tours, Thursday performed many in-store acoustic sessions at various Tower Records stores and other record stores. The band also recorded a live acoustic session for Y100 Sonic Sessions, a radio program on the now defunct Philadelphia-based radio station, Y100. The live acoustic version of single "Signals Over the Air" was used on Y100 Sonic Sessions Volume 8. The band released two EPs: the first was Live from the SoHo & Santa Monica Stores Split EP and sold exclusively on iTunes, and the second was a promotion found in Revolver, called the Live in Detroit EP.

The band went on an indefinite hiatus in 2004, citing label pressure, extensive touring, and health problems as the reasons. However, Thursday returned for a charitable performance to save New York City's CBGB, on August 25, 2005, which was streamed live through the CBGB's website.

A City by the Light Divided and Envy split release (2006–2008)
In fall 2005, five Thursday demo songs were stolen from the iPod of the tour manager for My American Heart, a band Rickly had recently collaborated with for their song "We Are the Fabrication". The band issued a statement on their official website stating that they were disappointed the unfinished products leaked, but that they were glad that people take that much interest in their music. The band confirmed the title of one demo, "At This Velocity" and promised it would make their upcoming album. Three other songs ("The Other Side of the Crash/Over and Out (Of Control)", "Telegraph Avenue Kiss", and "Autumn Leaves Revisited") would also make the album, while the remaining demo would later become the song "Last Call" on their fifth studio album, Common Existence. Thursday had originally toyed with the idea of a double album to follow up War All the Time but the idea was scrapped, reporting on their website that they believed "not even The Beatles could properly fill two discs with enough worthy material".

Thursday released their fourth album and second major label release, A City by the Light Divided, on May 2, 2006, on Island Records in the US and Hassle Records in the United Kingdom. The album was produced by Dave Fridmann, becoming Thursday's first full-length album not produced by Sal Villanueva. The title was created by Geoff Rickly by combining two lines from the poem Sunstone by Octavio Paz. The album was available for preview on the band's MySpace page on April 18, 2006, two weeks before it was officially released. A City by the Light Divided was generally received well by critics, spawning two singles: "Counting 5-4-3-2-1" and "At This Velocity", though the latter received considerably less attention. The band left Island Records in early 2007.

At their 2007 New Year's Eve show at the Starland Ballroom, the band announced that they will be writing and recording new material in 2008. During a private show they performed on May 3, 2007 in New York City, long-time friend and artist manager, David "Rev" Ciancio proposed to his fiancée on stage. Thursday also held a performance on May 5 at The Bamboozle under the fake name Bearfort. Thursday cancelled all tour plans until their fall tour with Circle Takes the Square and Portugal. The Man in support of Kill the House Lights, a DVD/CD compilation album and live album. featuring demos, unreleased songs, footage of live performances, and a documentary about the band. The album was released on October 30, 2007 by their former label Victory Records.

Thursday announced on April 2, 2008, via a MySpace bulletin and their official website, a new split album with Japanese post-hardcore band Envy. The band debuted a song from the album live during their show in Poughkeepsie on April 24, 2008, and the album, Thursday / Envy, was released on Temporary Residence Limited on November 4, 2008.

Common Existence (2009–2010)
The band announced on September 30, 2008 that they had signed with Epitaph Records, regarding their new label the band stated: "It's a great feeling to have a label encourage you to be more socially conscious and politically active." Thursday released their fifth full-length album,Common Existence, on February 17, 2009 on Epitaph Records. In a March 2009 interview, Rickly explained the album's title refers to humanity's shared experience, and that many of the songs were influenced by the words of his favorite poets and authors: "Almost every song on the record is connected to a different writer. The first song, "Resuscitation of a Dead Man" is influenced by Denis Johnson's Resuscitation of a Hanged Man. Another song is based on a book [ Martin Amis'] Time's Arrow. The whole record also has a lot of themes from Roberto Bolano, a poet who wrote The Savage Detectives and a few other things. The song "Circuits of Fever" is very influenced by [writer] David Foster Wallace." Cormac McCarthy has also influenced Rickly.

Thursday headlined the 2009 Taste of Chaos Tour with support from Bring Me the Horizon, Four Year Strong, Pierce The Veil, Cancer Bats and a local act. The band was not well received on this tour, as the majority of the audience members showed up at tour dates mainly for opening act Bring Me the Horizon, with guitarist Tom Keeley approximating about 90% of the audience would leave before their set, and described the tour as an "awful experience."

No Devolución and disbandment (2011–2015)
Thursday began recording their next album in July 2010, at Tarbox Road Studios in Fredonia, New York with Dave Fridmann, who had also produced the group's two previous albums. Their sixth album and second release for Epitaph Records, No Devolución, was released on April 12, 2011. Vocalist Geoff Rickly commented on the style of the new album, stating, "In style, this record feels like a radical departure from our earlier records but in substance it feels like a return. The songs are more vulnerable than they've been in a long time. [...] It's very atmospheric and mood oriented so far." Rickly also stated that the primary lyrical theme is devotion. Thursday debuted "Turnpike Divides" at their annual holiday show on December 30, 2010 at the Starland Ballroom.

On November 22, 2011, Thursday posted a statement on their official website and their Twitter account reading "Thanks & Love", expressing their intention to stop producing music together. However, the statement about the status of band was ambiguous, not stating explicitly in the article whether they were breaking up or on an indefinite hiatus. The following is excerpted from the article:

In January 2013, Geoff Rickly stated during an interview that Thursday had in fact disbanded, and that the term "hiatus" was misleading as it had only been used in case the band did ever decided to play a show again. He did, however, indicate that there was a possibility for the band to play shows in the future, but no new material would ever be produced.

Since their disbandment, Rickly formed the band No Devotion in 2014 with former members of the band Lostprophets, and has continued his side-project United Nations. Tucker Rule became the touring drummer for the British Boy Band The Wanted, the pop-punk band Yellowcard and works as a hired musician as well as studio drummer.

Reunion and second breakup (2016–2019)
In January 2016, former members of Thursday posted a picture of themselves hanging out to Rickly's Twitter account. This sparked rumors that the band would soon be reuniting, however Rickly quickly dispelled these rumors saying that their communication was minimal in the five years since disbanding and they were "just finally mending some fences and healing some old wounds." Thursday's former booking agent began encouraging them to reunite the band with the freedom to do whatever they wanted and without the pressure of having to write a new album.

Two months later, Thursday announced they would reunite for Atlanta, Georgia's Wrecking Ball music festival in August 2016. In a statement about the reunion show, Rickly said: "Five years ago, we found it necessary to end Thursday for reasons beyond our control. Earlier this year, we were able to reconcile all of our differences and spend time together. This is a vital component to what we loved about being in Thursday and we're happy to say that we'll be playing this show as the same line-up that began touring together on Full Collapse and jointly worked on every record since." Thursday agreed to perform at Wrecking Ball only two days before publicly announcing their participation, and the decision was made after its organizers allowed the band to perform "in our own way, including involving a charity" and after hearing about the strong lineup of bands on the festival. The band had no intention to reunite before this decision. Two months later, it was announced that the band would be playing both Denver and Chicago dates of Riot Fest in September, causing speculation that the band may play more shows later on in the year.

On June 15, the band's official Instagram posted a picture of a show bill announcing a 'homecoming' on December 30 at Starland Ballroom. The caption on the Instagram post read, "NJ-you won't believe the homecoming we have planned. The lineup and SETLIST are going to be insane." On November 6, the band played the inaugural Sound on Sound fest just outside of Austin, TX.

On January 31, 2017, the band announced a 24 date tour to take place in March and April 2017. Aside from the tour, Thursday headlined the 2017 Northside Festival in Brooklyn, New York.

The band announced in October 2018 that they would be ending their reunion the following year while stating "when we stopped playing last time, it wasn't on the best of terms. This time, we get to put down touring on the very highest of notes: in each other's lives and able to pick up and play together behind closed doors whenever we want. If we are ever able to do Thursday again, it will be a new, separate chapter. Thank you all for your time, attention and friendship.". The band's final show took place on March 17, 2019 at Saint Vitus in Brooklyn, NY.

In May 2019, due to mounting pressure from their international fanbase, who did not get an opportunity to see the reunion tour, the band announced that they would play Germany and released the following statement: "We are so excited and surprised to be able to announce Family First Festival in Cologne. After our last show, we began conversations about all the places that we hadn't been able to play on our reunion. It seemed impossible that we would all be available at the same time to play shows again, especially in any sustained way. But when our old friends in boysetsfire asked us to play this festival with them, we saw that we had a rare opportunity to accomplish two things at once: visit a country that's always been kind to Thursday and play, once more, with a band that we've admired since before we were a band, a band that took us on one of our first tours ever. After much discussion among ourselves, we decided that there were certain cities around the globe that we had unfinished business in and if we find that, at some point in the future, we're in a position to play them, then we will. We hope to see you there."

They then proceeded to announce a show in Eindhoven, The Netherlands, and two UK shows to be held at London's Electric Ballroom, due to play Full Collapse on night one followed by War All the Time on night two, which took place in December 2019. Following this they appeared at The Shrine in Los Angeles on December 20, opening for the reunited My Chemical Romance.

Second return (2020–present)
Despite the band's previous statement that their reunion would come to an end, it was announced in June 2020 that Thursday would play their first show in nearly two years at Riot Fest in September 2021. They also played a series of live shows that same month on the East Coast and Midwest with Taking Back Sunday and Piebald.

Between August 2020 and April 2021, the band shared three virtual performances entitled Signals. The first performance (V1) featured guest guitarist Frank Iero, and largely consisted of stripped-back versions of the band's songs. The second (V2) was a commemorative holiday show, with guests including Iero, Jim Ward, Walter Schriefels and Bartees Strange. The third and final performance (V3) saw the band performing Full Collapse and No Devolución in their entirety.

In June 2021, the band shared a cover of Bruce Springsteen's "Dancing in the Dark" as part of an ongoing series of covers headed by the creative collective Two Minutes To Late Night.

In October 2021, the band were featured in Dan Ozzi's book Sellout: The Major Label Feeding Frenzy That Swept Punk, Emo, And Hardcore 1994–2007. A chapter on the band's major-label debut, War All the Time, was included in the book, as well as a photo of the band performing live serving as the book's cover.

In July 2022, the band headlined Philadelphia's This is Hardcore Fest, Playing "Full Collapse" in its entirety.

In September 2022, the band joined My Chemical Romance as a guest on their North American tour for 7 shows. For their last night on tour with MCR, Thursday welcomed Gerard Way on stage to perform 'Jet Black New Year', a song that features Way on the original recording, from their 2002 EP 'Five Stories Falling'. Rickly was welcomed back on stage during MCR's set to perform 'This Is The Best Day Ever', a song Rickly lent his voice to on My Chem's 2002 debut album. Thursday also brought out Anthony Green for 'Understanding In A Car Crash' during their opening set.

Logo

Thursday used a dove logo which is featured on much of the band's artwork and merchandise. The dove is believed to have been conceived by guitarist Tom Keeley on a tour bus sometime before Full Collapse was recorded. Lyrics from the song "Cross Out the Eyes" on the album reference a dove twice, but it is unknown if these lyrics were inspired by the dove art or vice versa.  The logo debuted on the cover art for War All the Time in 2003, appearing on the artwork for all of Thursday's album and single artwork until 2011, where it was notably absent on the cover art for their sixth and final album No Devolución.

The band also used a second logo, a red bullseye with a small chevron below it. This logo first appeared on the cover art for A City by the Light Divided in 2006, and featured on merchandise related to the album. It can also be seen faded in the background of the cover for Kill the House Lights.

Additionally, Shepard Fairey (Creator of Obey) created artwork for the band with a new dove logo, which has been used on other works by Fairey.

Members

Current members
Tom Keeley – lead guitar, backing vocals (1997–2011, 2016–2019, 2020–present)
Tim Payne – bass (1997–2011, 2016–2019, 2020–present)
Geoff Rickly – lead vocals (1997–2011, 2016–2019, 2020–present)
Tucker Rule – drums (1997–2011, 2016–2019, 2020–present)
Steve Pedulla – rhythm guitar, backing vocals (2000–2011, 2016–2019, 2020–present)

 Current touring musicians
Norman Brannon – guitar (2021–present)

Former members
Bill Henderson – rhythm guitar, backing vocals (1997–2000)
Andrew Everding – keyboards, synthesizer, backing vocals (2004–2011, 2016–2019)

 Former touring musicians
Lukas Previn – bass (2011)
Stuart Richardson – bass (2017, 2022)
Brooks Tipton – keyboards, synthesizer (2011–2012)
Chris “Ghost” Macias - bass (2004,2006)

Timeline

Discography

 Waiting (1999)
 Full Collapse (2001)
 War All the Time (2003)
 A City by the Light Divided (2006)
 Common Existence (2009)
 No Devolución (2011)

Notes

References

External links

 

Emo musical groups from New Jersey
American screamo musical groups
American post-hardcore musical groups
Musical groups established in 1997
Musical groups from New Jersey
Victory Records artists
Epitaph Records artists
Island Records artists
Musical groups disestablished in 2012
Musical groups reestablished in 2016
Musical groups disestablished in 2019
Musical groups reestablished in 2020
Temporary Residence Limited artists
1997 establishments in New Jersey
Equal Vision Records artists